The year 1992 in film involved many significant film releases.

Highest-grossing films

The top 10 films released in 1992 by worldwide gross are as follows:

Events
 August 24 – Production begins on Jurassic Park.

Awards

1992 wide-release films

January–March

April–June

July–September

October–December

Notable films released in 1992
United States unless stated

#
1492: Conquest of Paradise, directed by Ridley Scott, starring Gérard Depardieu, Sigourney Weaver, Armand Assante, Loren Dean – (Spain/U.K./France)
1991: The Year Punk Broke
588 rue paradis, Directed by Henri Verneuil, starring Richard Berry and Omar Sharif – (France)

A
Afterburn, directed by Robert Markowitz, starring Laura Dern, Robert Loggia, Vincent Spano, Michael Rooker
Agantuk (The Stranger), directed by Satyajit Ray – (India) – winner of FIPRESCI Award at Venice Film Festival
Al-Lail (The Night) – (Syria)
Aladdin, directed by John Musker and Ron Clements, produced by Walt Disney Feature Animation
Alien 3, directed by David Fincher, starring Sigourney Weaver, Charles S. Dutton, Charles Dance, Pete Postlethwaite
All's Well, Ends Well (Ga Yau Hei Si), starring Maggie Cheung and Leslie Cheung – (Hong Kong)
American Heart, directed by Martin Bell, starring Jeff Bridges and Edward Furlong
American Me, directed by and starring Edward James Olmos, with William Forsythe
Angaar (Fire), starring Jackie Shroff and Dimple Kapadia – (India)
Army of Darkness, directed by Sam Raimi, starring Bruce Campbell, Embeth Davidtz, Marcus Gilbert, Ian Abercrombie 
Article 99, directed by Howard Deutch, starring Ray Liotta, Kiefer Sutherland, Forest Whitaker, Lea Thompson

B
The Babe, directed by Arthur Hiller, starring John Goodman (as Babe Ruth), with Kelly McGillis, Trini Alvarado, Bruce Boxleitner, James Cromwell
Bad Lieutenant, directed by Abel Ferrara, starring Harvey Keitel
Baduk – (Iran)
Basic Instinct, directed by Paul Verhoeven, starring Michael Douglas, Sharon Stone, Jeanne Tripplehorn, George Dzundza
Batman Returns, directed by Tim Burton, starring Michael Keaton, Danny DeVito, Michelle Pfeiffer, Christopher Walken, Michael Murphy
Bébé's Kids
Beethoven, directed by Brian Levant, starring Charles Grodin and Bonnie Hunt
Being at Home with Claude – (Canada)
Belle Époque (The Age of Beauty) – (Spain) – Academy Award for Best Foreign Language Film (for 1993)
Benny's Video, directed by Michael Haneke – (Austria)
The Best Intentions (Den goda viljan), directed by Bille August – (Sweden) – winner of Palme d'Or
Bharatham, starring Mohanlal – (India)
Bitter Moon, directed by Roman Polanski, starring Hugh Grant and Kristin Scott Thomas – (U.K./France)
Blame It on the Bellboy, starring Dudley Moore, Bryan Brown, Richard Griffiths, Patsy Kensit, Bronson Pinchot
Blue Ice, starring Michael Caine and Sean Young
Bob Roberts, directed by and starring Tim Robbins, with Giancarlo Esposito, Brian Murray, Alan Rickman, Ray Wise, Gore Vidal
The Bodyguard, directed by Mick Jackson, starring Kevin Costner and Whitney Houston
Boomerang, directed by Reginald Hudlin, starring Eddie Murphy, David Alan Grier, Halle Berry, Martin Lawrence, Robin Givens
Braindead, directed by Peter Jackson – (New Zealand)
Bram Stoker's Dracula, directed by Francis Ford Coppola, starring Gary Oldman, Winona Ryder, Anthony Hopkins, Keanu Reeves
The Bridge, starring Saskia Reeves and David O'Hara – (U.K.)
Buffy The Vampire Slayer, directed by Fran Rubel Kuzui, starring Kristy Swanson, Luke Perry, Donald Sutherland, Rutger Hauer, Paul Reubens

C
Candyman, starring Virginia Madsen and Tony Todd
Captain Ron, starring Kurt Russell and Martin Short
Careful – (Canada)
Céline, directed by Jean-Claude Brisseau – (France)
Center Stage (yun ling yuk), directed by Stanley Kwan, starring Maggie Cheung and Tony Leung Ka-fai – (Hong Kong)
Chain of Desire, starring Linda Fiorentino, Malcolm McDowell, Holly Marie Combs
Chaplin, directed by Richard Attenborough, starring Robert Downey, Jr., Anthony Hopkins, Kevin Kline, Marisa Tomei, Diane Lane, Dan Aykroyd – (UK/US)
The Chekist – (Russia)
Christopher Columbus: The Discovery, directed by John Glen, starring Georges Corraface, Rachel Ward, Tom Selleck, Marlon Brando
Chunuk Bair – (New Zealand)
Ciao, Professore! (Let's Hope I Make It), directed by Lina Wertmüller – (Italy)
City of Joy, starring Patrick Swayze – (U.K./France)
Class Act
Un coeur en hiver (A Heart in Winter), starring Daniel Auteuil and Emmanuelle Béart – (France)
The Comrades of Summer, starring Joe Mantegna
Consenting Adults, directed by Alan J. Pakula, starring Kevin Kline, Mary Elizabeth Mastrantonio, Kevin Spacey, Rebecca Miller, Forest Whitaker
Cool World, starring Kim Basinger, Gabriel Byrne, Brad Pitt
CrissCross, directed by Chris Menges, starring Goldie Hawn and Arliss Howard
Crossing the Bridge, starring Josh Charles and Jason Gedrick
The Crying Game, directed by Neil Jordan, starring Stephen Rea, Jaye Davidson, Miranda Richardson, Forest Whitaker – (U.K.)
Crystal Nights (Krystallines nyhtes) – (Greece)
The Cutting Edge, directed by Paul Michael Glaser, starring D. B. Sweeney and Moira Kelly

D
Daens – (Belgium/Netherlands/France)
Damage, directed by Louis Malle, starring Jeremy Irons, Juliette Binoche, Miranda Richardson – (U.K.)
Day of Atonement, starring Roger Hanin, Christopher Walken, Jennifer Beals
Death Becomes Her, directed by Robert Zemeckis, starring Meryl Streep, Bruce Willis, Goldie Hawn
Deep Cover, directed by Bill Duke, starring Laurence Fishburne, Jeff Goldblum, Clarence Williams III, Charles Martin Smith
Diggstown, directed by Michael Ritchie, starring James Woods, Louis Gossett Jr., Oliver Platt, Bruce Dern, Heather Graham
The Distinguished Gentleman, starring Eddie Murphy
Dream of Light (El Sol del Membrillo) – (Spain)
Dust of Angels (Siàu-liān-ê Àn-la!) – (Taiwan)

E
El Mariachi, directed by Robert Rodriguez – (Mexico/United States)
Ele, My Friend, directed by Dharan Mandrayar - (India/U.K.)
Enchanted April, directed by Mike Newell, starring Miranda Richardson, Joan Plowright, Josie Lawrence, Polly Walker – (U.K.)
Encino Man, starring Sean Astin, Brendan Fraser, Pauly Shore
Encore, Once More Encore! (Ankor, eshchyo ankor!) – (Russia)
The End of the World (O Fim do Mundo) – (Portugal)
Equinox, directed by Alan Rudolph, starring Matthew Modine, Kevin J. O'Connor, Lara Flynn Boyle, Tyra Ferrell, Lori Singer, Fred Ward

F
Falling from Grace, directed by and starring John Mellencamp, with Mariel Hemingway, Kay Lenz, Claude Akins
Far and Away, directed by Ron Howard, starring Tom Cruise and Nicole Kidman
FernGully: The Last Rainforest, directed by Bill Kroyer – (Australia/United States)
A Few Good Men, directed by Rob Reiner, starring Tom Cruise, Jack Nicholson, Demi Moore, Kevin Bacon, Kevin Pollak, Kiefer Sutherland
Fifty/Fifty, starring Peter Weller and Robert Hays
Final Analysis, directed by Phil Joanou, starring Richard Gere, Kim Basinger, Uma Thurman, Eric Roberts, Keith David
Firingoti, Assamese film starring Moloya Goswami
Folks!, starring Tom Selleck, Don Ameche, Anne Jackson, Wendy Crewson, Christine Ebersole, Michael Murphy
Forbidden Love: The Unashamed Stories of Lesbian Lives – (Canada)
Forever Young, starring Mel Gibson, Elijah Wood, Jamie Lee Curtis, George Wendt
For a Lost Soldier ("Voor een verloren soldaat"), directed by Roeland Kerbosch, starring Jeroen Krabbé, Maarten Smit – (Netherlands)
Four Eyes and Six Guns, starring Judge Reinhold, Patricia Clarkson, Fred Ward
Freejack, starring Emilio Estevez, Anthony Hopkins, Rene Russo, Mick Jagger
Frozen Assets, starring Shelley Long

G
Gas Food Lodging, directed by Allison Anders, starring Brooke Adams, Ione Skye and Fairuza Balk
Gladiator, starring Cuba Gooding, Jr. and James Marshall
Glengarry Glen Ross, directed by James Foley, starring Al Pacino, Jack Lemmon, Alec Baldwin, Ed Harris, Jonathan Pryce, Alan Arkin, Kevin Spacey
Godzilla and Mothra: The Battle for Earth (Gojira tai Mosura) – (Japan)
The Gun in Betty Lou's Handbag, starring Penelope Ann Miller, Cathy Moriarty, Julianne Moore
Gunsmoke: To the Last Man, starring James Arness, Pat Hingle, Amy Stock-Poynton, Matt Mulhern, Jason Lively, Morgan Woodward, Amanda Wyss, Jim Beaver, Don Collier

H
The Hand That Rocks the Cradle, directed by Curtis Hanson, starring Rebecca De Mornay and Annabella Sciorra
Hard Boiled (Lat sau san taam), directed by John Woo, starring Chow Yun-fat and Tony Leung Chiu-Wai – (Hong Kong)
Hero, directed by Stephen Frears, starring Dustin Hoffman, Geena Davis, Andy García, Joan Cusack
Hoffa, directed by Danny DeVito, starring Jack Nicholson, DeVito, Armand Assante, J. T. Walsh, Kevin Anderson, John C. Reilly
Home Alone 2: Lost in New York, starring Macaulay Culkin, Joe Pesci, Daniel Stern
Honey, I Blew Up the Kid, starring Rick Moranis
Honeymoon in Vegas, directed by Andrew Bergman, starring James Caan, Nicolas Cage, Sarah Jessica Parker
HouseSitter, directed by Frank Oz, starring Steve Martin and Goldie Hawn
Howards End, directed by James Ivory, starring Anthony Hopkins, Emma Thompson, Vanessa Redgrave, Helena Bonham Carter – (U.K.)
Hurricane Smith – (Australia)
Husbands and Wives, directed by and starring Woody Allen, with Mia Farrow, Judy Davis, Liam Neeson, Sydney Pollack
Hyena's (Hyènes) – (Senegal)

I
An Independent Life (Samostoyatelnaya zhizn) – (Russia)
Indochine, starring Catherine Deneuve – (France) – Academy and Golden Globe Awards for Best Foreign Language Film
The Inheritance or Fuckoffguysgoodday (Dědictví aneb Kurvahošigutntag) – (Czech Republic)
Innocent Blood, directed by John Landis, starring Anne Parillaud, Anthony LaPaglia, Robert Loggia, Don Rickles
Into the Sun, starring Anthony Michael Hall and Michael Paré
Into the West, directed by Mike Newell, starring Gabriel Byrne and Ellen Barkin – (U.K./Ireland)
In the Soup, starring Steve Buscemi and Seymour Cassel

J
Jamón Jamón, starring Penélope Cruz and Javier Bardem – (Spain)
Jennifer 8, starring Andy García, Uma Thurman and John Malkovich
The Journey (El viaje) – (Argentina)
Juice, starring Omar Epps and Tupac Shakur
Just Another Girl on the I.R.T.
Justice, My Foot! (Sam sei goon), starring Stephen Chow – (Hong Kong)

K
Khiladi (Player) – (India)
Killer Image, starring Michael Ironside and M. Emmet Walsh – (Canada)
Knight Moves, starring Christopher Lambert and Diane Lane
Kuffs, starring Christian Slater and Milla Jovovich

L
Ladybugs, starring Rodney Dangerfield and Jonathan Brandis
The Last of the Mohicans, directed by Michael Mann, starring Daniel Day-Lewis and Madeleine Stowe
The Lawnmower Man, starring Jeff Fahey and Pierce Brosnan
A League of Their Own, directed by Penny Marshall, starring Geena Davis, Tom Hanks, Madonna, Lori Petty, Rosie O'Donnell, David Strathairn
Leap of Faith, directed by Richard Pearce, starring Steve Martin, Liam Neeson, Debra Winger, Lolita Davidovich, Lukas Haas
Leaving Normal, directed by Edward Zwick, starring Christine Lahti and Meg Tilly
Léolo – (Canada)
Lethal Weapon 3, starring Mel Gibson, Danny Glover, Joe Pesci, Rene Russo
Life According to Agfa (Ha-Chayim Al-Pi Agfa) – (Israel)
Light Sleeper, directed by Paul Schrader, starring Susan Sarandon, Willem Dafoe, Dana Delany
Like Water For Chocolate (Como agua para chocolate) – (Mexico)
Live Wire, directed by Christian Duguay, starring Pierce Brosnan and Ron Silver
The Living End, directed by Gregg Araki
Living in Bondage – (Nigeria)
The Long Day Closes, directed by Terence Davies – (U.K.)
Lorenzo's Oil, directed by George Miller, starring Nick Nolte and Susan Sarandon
Love Crimes, starring Sean Young and Patrick Bergin
Love Field, directed by Jonathan Kaplan, starring Michelle Pfeiffer and Dennis Haysbert
Love Potion No. 9, starring Sandra Bullock and Tate Donovan
The Lover (L'Amant), directed by Jean-Jacques Annaud – (France)
Luna Park, starring Oleg Borisov – (Russia/France)

M
Mac, directed by and starring John Turturro
Mad at the Moon, starring Mary Stuart Masterson
Malcolm X, directed by Spike Lee, starring Denzel Washington
The Mambo Kings, starring Armand Assante, Antonio Banderas, Cathy Moriarty, Maruschka Detmers, Desi Arnaz Jr.
Man Bites Dog (aka C'est arrivé près de chez vous) – (Belgium)
Man Trouble, directed by Bob Rafelson, starring Jack Nicholson and Ellen Barkin
Manufacturing Consent: Noam Chomsky and the Media – (International)
Medicine Man, directed by John McTiernan, starring Sean Connery and Lorraine Bracco
Memoirs of an Invisible Man, directed by John Carpenter, starring Chevy Chase, Daryl Hannah, Sam Neill, Michael McKean
Me Myself & I, starring JoBeth Williams and George Segal
A Midnight Clear, directed by Keith Gordon, starring Ethan Hawke and Kevin Dillon
The Mighty Ducks, starring Emilio Estevez
Minbo – (Japan)
Miracle Beach, starring Dean Cameron, Ami Dolenz, Pat Morita
Mistress, starring Robert De Niro, Robert Wuhl, Martin Landau, Danny Aiello, Eli Wallach, Sheryl Lee Ralph
Mo' Money, starring Damon Wayans
The Moon Is... the Sun's Dream, directed by Park Chan-wook – (South Korea)
Morte di un matematico napoletano (Death of a Neapolitan Mathematician) – (Italy)
Mr. Baseball, starring Tom Selleck
Mr. Saturday Night, directed by and starring Billy Crystal, with Helen Hunt, Julie Warner, David Paymer
The Muppet Christmas Carol, starring Michael Caine and the Muppets
 My Cousin Vinny, directed by Jonathan Lynn, starring Joe Pesci, Marisa Tomei, Ralph Macchio, Fred Gwynne

N
Nemesis – (Denmark/United States)
New Dragon Gate Inn (Sun lung moon hak chan), starring Tony Leung Ka-fai and Maggie Cheung – (Hong Kong)
Newsies, starring Christian Bale, Robert Duvall, Ann-Margret, and Bill Pullman
Night and the City, directed by Irwin Winkler, starring Robert De Niro, Jessica Lange, Jack Warden, Alan King
Nitrate Kisses
Noises Off, directed by Peter Bogdanovich, starring Michael Caine, Carol Burnett, John Ritter, Marilu Henner, Christopher Reeve
The Northerners (De Noorderlingen) – (Netherlands)

O
The Oak (Balanţa) – (Romania)
Of Mice and Men, directed by and starring Gary Sinise, with John Malkovich, Casey Siemaszko, Sherilyn Fenn, Ray Walston
Once Upon a Crime, starring John Candy, James Belushi, Cybill Shepherd, Sean Young, Ornella Muti, George Hamilton
Once Upon a Time, Cinema (Nasseroddin Shah Actor-e Cinema) – (Iran)
Once Upon a Time in China II (Wong Fei Hung II – Nam yi dong ji keung), starring Jet Li – (Hong Kong)
One False Move, directed by Carl Franklin, starring Bill Paxton, Cynda Williams, Michael Beach, Billy Bob Thornton
Only You, directed by Betty Thomas, starring Andrew McCarthy, Helen Hunt, Kelly Preston
Original Sin (Shindi mo ii), directed by Takashi Ishii – (Japan)
Orlando, starring Tilda Swinton and Billy Zane – (U.K.)
Our Twisted Hero (Urideul-ui ilgeuleojin yeongung) – (South Korea)
Out on a Limb, starring Matthew Broderick

P
Passed Away, starring Bob Hoskins, Tim Curry, Blair Brown, Pamela Reed, Peter Riegert, William Petersen, Nancy Travis
Passenger 57, starring Wesley Snipes, Bruce Payne, Tom Sizemore, Elizabeth Hurley
Passion Fish, directed by John Sayles, starring Mary McDonnell and Alfre Woodard
Patriot Games, directed by Phillip Noyce, starring Harrison Ford, Anne Archer, Sean Bean, Patrick Bergin, James Earl Jones, Richard Harris
Pet Sematary Two, starring Edward Furlong, Anthony Edwards and Clancy Brown
Peter's Friends, directed by Kenneth Branagh, starring Hugh Laurie, Stephen Fry, Rita Rudner, Emma Thompson – (U.K.)
The Player, directed by Robert Altman, starring Tim Robbins, Greta Scacchi, Cynthia Stevenson, Vincent D'Onofrio, Peter Gallagher, Whoopi Goldberg — Golden Globe Award for Best Picture (Musical or Comedy)
Poison Ivy, starring Drew Barrymore, Sara Gilbert, Tom Skerritt, Cheryl Ladd
Police Story 3: Super Cop (Jing cha gu shi III: Chao ji jing cha), starring Jackie Chan – (Hong Kong)
Porco Rosso (Kurenai no Buta) – (Japan)
The Power of One, directed by John G. Avildsen
Prelude to a Kiss, starring Alec Baldwin and Meg Ryan
The Public Eye, directed by Howard Franklin, starring Joe Pesci, Barbara Hershey, Stanley Tucci, Jared Harris
Pure Country, starring George Strait
Pushing Hands (tuī shǒu), directed by Ang Lee – (China/Taiwan)

Q
Quicksand: No Escape, starring Donald Sutherland, Tim Matheson, Felicity Huffman

R
Raat, starring Revathi, Rohini Hattangadi, Om Puri – (India)
Radio Flyer, starring Elijah Wood
Rain Without Thunder, starring Betty Buckley and Jeff Daniels
Raising Cain, directed by Brian De Palma, starring John Lithgow and Lolita Davidovich
Ramayana: The Legend of Prince Rama, directed by Ram Mohan – (India/Japan)
Rapid Fire, starring Brandon Lee and Powers Boothe
Rebels of the Neon God – (Taiwan)
Remote Control (Sódóma Reykjavík) – (Iceland)
Reservoir Dogs, directed by Quentin Tarantino, starring Harvey Keitel, Michael Madsen, Tim Roth, Steve Buscemi, Chris Penn, Lawrence Tierney
A River Runs Through It, directed by Robert Redford, starring Craig Sheffer, Brad Pitt, Tom Skerritt, Brenda Blethyn, Emily Lloyd
Rock-a-Doodle, directed by Don Bluth
Roja (Rose), directed by Mani Ratnam – (India) – nominated for Best Film at Moscow International Film Festival
Romper Stomper, starring Russell Crowe – (Australia)
Ruby, starring Danny Aiello (as Jack Ruby), Sherilyn Fenn, Arliss Howard

S
Samantha, starring Martha Plimpton and Dermot Mulroney
Savage Nights (Les Nuits Fauves) – (France)
Scent of a Woman, directed by Martin Brest, starring Al Pacino, Chris O'Donnell, Philip Seymour Hoffman, Gabrielle Anwar – Golden Globe Award for Best Picture (Drama)
School Ties, starring Brendan Fraser, Chris O'Donnell, Matt Damon, Ben Affleck
Schtonk! (aka Schtonk! Der Film zum Buch vom Führer) – (Germany)
Seedpeople, directed by Peter Manoogian, produced by Charles Band
Shakes the Clown, directed by and starring Bobcat Goldthwait, with Julie Brown, Kathy Griffin, Florence Henderson
Shining Through, directed by David Seltzer, starring Michael Douglas, Melanie Griffith, John Gielgud, Joely Richardson, Liam Neeson
Sidekicks, starring Jonathan Brandis and Chuck Norris
Single White Female, directed by Barbet Schroeder, starring Bridget Fonda and Jennifer Jason Leigh
Singles, directed by Cameron Crowe, starring Bridget Fonda, Matt Dillon, Campbell Scott, Kyra Sedgwick
Sister Act, starring Whoopi Goldberg
Sleepwalkers, directed by Mick Garris, starring Mädchen Amick, Brian Krause, Alice Krige, based on a novel by Stephen King
Sneakers, starring Robert Redford, Dan Aykroyd, Sidney Poitier, River Phoenix, Ben Kingsley, Mary McDonnell
The Spirit of Christmas: Jesus vs. Frosty, directed by Trey Parker and Matt Stone
Split Infinity
Split Second, starring Rutger Hauer and Kim Cattrall – (U.K.)
Stay Tuned, directed by Peter Hyams, starring John Ritter and Pam Dawber
The Stolen Children (Il ladro di bambini) – (Italy)
Stop! Or My Mom Will Shoot, starring Sylvester Stallone and Estelle Getty
The Story of Qiu Ju (Qiu Ju da guan si), directed by Zhang Yimou, starring Gong Li – (China) – Golden Lion award
Storyville, starring James Spader
Straight Talk, starring Dolly Parton and James Woods
A Stranger Among Us, directed by Sidney Lumet, starring Melanie Griffith, Eric Thal, John Pankow, Tracy Pollan, Mia Sara
Strictly Ballroom, directed by Baz Luhrmann – (Australia)
Sumo Do, Sumo Don't (Shiko funjatta) – (Japan) – Japan Academy Prize for Picture of the Year
The Sun of the Sleepless (Udzinarta mze) – (Georgia)
Sweet Emma, Dear Böbe (Édes Emma, drága Böbe – vázlatok, aktok), directed by István Szabó – (Hungary)

T
A Tale of Winter (Conte d'hiver), directed by Éric Rohmer – (France)
Talking Head (Tōkingu Heddo) – (Japan)
That Night, starring C. Thomas Howell and Juliette Lewis
There Goes the Neighborhood, starring Jeff Daniels, Catherine O'Hara, Héctor Elizondo, Rhea Perlman
This Is My Life, directed by Nora Ephron, starring Samantha Mathis, Julie Kavner, Dan Aykroyd, Carrie Fisher
Thunderheart, starring Val Kilmer, Sam Shepard, Graham Greene, Fred Ward
Timescape
Titanica, IMAX documentary
Tito and Me (Tito i ja) – (Yugoslavia)
Toys, directed by Barry Levinson, starring Robin Williams, Michael Gambon, Joan Cusack, Robin Wright, LL Cool J, Donald O'Connor
Traces of Red, starring James Belushi and Lorraine Bracco
Trespass, directed by Walter Hill, starring Ice Cube, Ice-T, Bill Paxton, William Sadler
Twin Peaks: Fire Walk with Me, directed by David Lynch, starring Kiefer Sutherland, Kyle MacLachlan, Sheryl Lee, Moira Kelly, Mädchen Amick, David Bowie

U
Under Siege, directed by Andrew Davis, starring Steven Seagal, Tommy Lee Jones, Erika Eleniak, Gary Busey
Unforgiven, directed by and starring Clint Eastwood, with Gene Hackman, Morgan Freeman, Richard Harris – Academy Award for Best Picture
Universal Soldier, starring Jean-Claude Van Damme and Dolph Lundgren
Unlawful Entry, directed by Jonathan Kaplan, starring Kurt Russell, Ray Liotta, Madeleine Stowe
Utz, starring Armin Mueller-Stahl, Brenda Fricker, Peter Riegert – (U.K.)

V
Vacas (Cows) – (Spain)
Volume the Dash, directed by Steve Miner, starring

W
The Waterdance, starring Eric Stoltz, Helen Hunt, Wesley Snipes
Waterland, directed by Stephen Gyllenhaal, starring Jeremy Irons, Sinéad Cusack, Ethan Hawke – (U.K.)
Wayne's World, directed by Penelope Spheeris, starring Mike Myers, Dana Carvey, Rob Lowe, Tia Carrere, Brian Doyle-Murray, Lara Flynn Boyle
We Are Not Angels (Mi nismo anđeli) – (Yugoslavia)
Where the Day Takes You, starring Sean Astin and Lara Flynn Boyle
Whispers in the Dark, starring Annabella Sciorra, Jamey Sheridan, Jill Clayburgh, Alan Alda, John Leguizamo, Anthony LaPaglia
White Badge (Hayan chonjaeng) – (South Korea)
White Men Can't Jump, directed by Ron Shelton, starring Wesley Snipes, Woody Harrelson, Rosie Perez
White Sands, directed by Roger Donaldson, starring Willem Dafoe, Mary Elizabeth Mastrantonio, Mickey Rourke, Samuel L. Jackson
Wind, directed by Carroll Ballard, starring Matthew Modine, Jennifer Grey, Cliff Robertson, Jack Thompson, Stellan Skarsgård
Wuthering Heights, starring Juliette Binoche and Ralph Fiennes – (U.K.)

Y
Year of the Comet, starring Penelope Ann Miller, Tim Daly, Louis Jourdan
The Yo-Yo Gang – (Canada)
Yodha, starring Mohanlal and Madhoo – (India)

Z
Zebrahead, starring Michael Rapaport and N'Bushe Wright

Births
January 5
Mike Faist, American actor
Suki Waterhouse, English actress, model and singer
January 8 - Dali Benssalah, French-Algerian actor
January 11 – Laysla De Oliveira, Canadian actress
January 19 – Logan Lerman, American actor
February 6 – Nora Fatehi, Canadian actress, model, dancer, singer, and producer
February 9 – Avan Jogia, Canadian actor
February 10 – Karen Fukuhara, American actress
February 11
Blair Dunlop, English folk musician and actor
Georgia Groome, actress
Taylor Lautner, actor
February 14 – Freddie Highmore, English actor
February 15 – Greer Grammer, actress
February 16 - Jimmy Tatro, American actor, comedian, writer and YouTube personality
February 23 - Samara Weaving, Australian actress and model
February 29 - Jessie T. Usher, American actor
March 5 - Amber Anderson, English actress and model
March 10 – Emily Osment, actress
March 13
George MacKay, British actor
Kaya Scodelario, British actress
March 15
Sosie Bacon, American actress
Anna Shaffer, British actress
March 16 - Kim Mi-soo, South Korean actress and model (died 2022)
March 17
Eliza Bennett, English actress and singer
John Boyega, British actor
March 26 - Haley Ramm, American actress
March 28 - Daisy Bevan, English actress
April 2 - Sammi Kane Kraft, American baseball player, musician and actress (died 2012)
April 4 – Alexa Nikolas, actress
April 8 - Shelby Young, American actress
April 10 – Daisy Ridley, English actress
April 12 – Giorgio Cantarini, actor
April 23 – Syd tha Kyd, singer and DJ
April 24
Joe Keery, American actor and musician
Jack Quaid, American actor
April 25 - Adria Arjona, American actress
May 4
Courtney Jines, actress
Ashley Rickards, actress
Miles Robbins, American musician and actor
May 7 – Alexander Ludwig, actor
May 10 - Sophie Vavasseur, Irish actress
May 12 - Malcolm David Kelley, American rapper, singer-songwriter and actor
May 18 – Spencer Breslin, American actor
May 20 - Jack Gleeson, Irish actor
May 21 - Olivia Olson, American actress and singer-songwriter
May 29 – Erica Lindbeck, actress, voice actress
June 3 - Dilraba Dilmurat, Chinese actress
June 10 - Kate Upton, American model and actress
June 11 - Anna Sawai, New Zealand actress and singer of Japanese descent
June 12 – Ryan Malgarini, American actor
June 14 – Daryl Sabara, actor
June 23 - Yoson An, Chinese-born New Zealand actor and filmmaker
June 26 – Jennette McCurdy, actress and singer
July 1 - Rhea Chakraborty, Indian actress
July 3 – Nathalia Ramos, actress
July 7 – Manjot Singh, Indian actor
July 9 – Douglas Booth, actor
July 12 – Woo Do-hwan, South Korean actor
July 15 - Vaishali Takkar, Indian actress (died 2022)
July 17 - Billie Lourd, American actress
July 20 - Paige Hurd, American actress
July 22
Selena Gomez, actress and singer
Aleksandr Kuznetsov, Ukrainian-Russian actor
July 30 – Julia Ragnarsson, actress
July – Francesca Hayward, ballerina, actress, and singer
August 2 - Charli XCX, English singer
August 3 – Christine Ko, actress
August 4 – Dylan and Cole Sprouse, actors
August 12 – Cara Delevingne, British actress and model
August 20 
Neslihan Atagül, actress
Demi Lovato, actress and singer
September 11 - Vinnie Bennett, New Zealand actor
September 16 – Nick Jonas, singer (Jonas Brothers)
September 17 - Danny Ramirez, American actor
September 27 - Sam Lerner, American actor
September 28 – Skye McCole Bartusiak, actress (died 2014)
September 30
Baifern, Thailandese actress
Ezra Miller, actor
October 9 – Tyler James Williams, actor
October 11 - Cardi B, American rapper and actress
October 12 – Josh Hutcherson, actor
October 13 – Aaron Dismuke, voice actor
October 15 – Vincent Martella, American actor, voice actor and singer
October 17
Nanami Sakuraba, Japanese actress
Barry Keoghan, actor
October 21 - Natasha Bassett, Australian actress
October 30 - Tequan Richmond, American actor and rapper
November 7 - Mary Chieffo, American actress
November 11 - Ashleigh Cummings, Australian actress
November 18 – Nathan Kress, American actor
November 23 – Miley Cyrus, American actress and singer
December 10 - Melissa Roxburgh, Canadian actress
December 14 - Tori Kelly, American singer, songwriter, actress and record producer
December 18 – Bridgit Mendler, American singer and actress
December 22 - Shioli Kutsuna, Japanese-Australian actress

Deaths

Film debuts
Gillian Anderson – The Turning
David Arquette – Where the Day Takes You
Maria Bello – Maintenance
Jack Black – Bob Roberts
Toni Collette – Spotswood
Daniel Craig – The Power of One
Penélope Cruz – Jamón Jamón
Alan Cumming – Prague
Liam Cunningham – Into the West
John Cygan – Crow's Nest
Eliza Dushku – That Night
Aaron Eckhart – Double Jeopardy
Omar Epps – Juice
Donald Faison – Juice
Chris Farley – Wayne's World
Ralph Fiennes – Emily Brontë's Wuthering Heights
Claire Forlani – Gypsy Eyes
Jamie Foxx – Toys
Walton Goggins – Forever Young
Adam Goldberg – Mr. Saturday Night
Joseph Gordon-Levitt – Beethoven
Peter Greene – Laws of Gravity
Maggie Gyllenhaal – Waterland
Cole Hauser – School Ties
Lena Headey – Waterland
Katherine Heigl – That Night
Jennifer Love Hewitt – Munchie
Famke Janssen – Fathers & Sons
Toby Jones – Orlando
Ashley Judd – Kuffs
Igor Khait (animator) – Bébé's Kids
Vincent Laresca – Juice
Heath Ledger – Clowning Around
Ang Lee (director) – Pushing Hands
Laura Linney – Lorenzo's Oil
Lucy Liu – Rhythm of Destiny
Ron Livingston – Straight Talk
Donal Logue – Sneakers
Faizon Love – Bébé's Kids
Baz Luhrmann (director) – Strictly Ballroom
Bernie Mac – Mo' Money
Chi McBride – The Distinguished Gentleman
Eric McCormack – The Lost World
Rose McGowan – Encino Man
Julian McMahon – Wet and Wild Summer!
Mike Myers – Wayne's World
Elise Neal – Malcolm X 
Tim Blake Nelson – This Is My Life
Rosie O'Donnell – A League of Their Own
Michael Rapaport – Zebrahead
Robert Rodriguez (director) – El Mariachi
Keri Russell – Honey, I Blew Up the Kid
M. Night Shyamalan (director) – Praying with Anger
Gary Sinise – A Midnight Clear (actor)
Will Smith – Where the Day Takes You
Toby Stephens – Orlando
Hilary Swank – Buffy the Vampire Slayer
Quentin Tarantino (director) – Reservoir Dogs
Jeanne Tripplehorn – Basic Instinct
Robin Tunney – Encino Man
Karl Urban – Chunuk Bair
John Ventimiglia – Swoon

References

 
Film by year